Events in the year 2016 in Guyana

Incumbents
President: David Granger
Prime Minister: Moses Nagamootoo

 
2010s in Guyana
Years of the 21st century in Guyana
Guyana
Guyana